This is a list of films which have placed number one at the box office in New Zealand during 2022.

Number-one films

Highest-grossing films

Records

References

See also 
 List of New Zealand films – New Zealand films by year
 2023 in film

2023

2023
New Zealand